Torbjörn Johansson (born 23 January 1970) is a retired Swedish middle-distance runner who competed primarily in the 800 metres. He represented his country at the 1995 IAAF World Indoor Championships and 1995 World Championships.

His personal bests in the event are 1:46.25 outdoors (Helsinki 1994) and 1:47.37 indoors (Stockholm 1995).

Competition record

References

1970 births
Living people
Swedish male middle-distance runners
World Athletics Championships athletes for Sweden